Troy Trojans basketball may refer to either of the basketball teams that represent Troy University:

Troy Trojans men's basketball
Troy Trojans women's basketball